The Standards of Fundamental Astronomy (SOFA) software libraries are a collection of subroutines that implement official International Astronomical Union (IAU) algorithms for astronomical computations.

As of February 2009 they are available in both Fortran and C source code format.

Capabilities
The subroutines in the libraries cover the following areas:

 Calendars
 Time scales
 Earth's rotation and sidereal time
 Ephemerides (limited precision)
 Precession, nutation, polar motion
 Proper motion
 Star catalog conversions
 Astrometric transformations
 Galactic Coordinates

Licensing
As of the February 2009 release, SOFA licensing changed to allow use for any purpose, provided certain requirements are met. Previously, commercial usage was specifically excluded and required written agreement of the SOFA board.

See also
 Naval Observatory Vector Astrometry Subroutines

References

External links
SOFA Home Page
Scholarpedia overview of SOFA
International Astronomical Union and Working group "Standards of Fundamental Astronomy

Celestial mechanics
Astronomical coordinate systems
Numerical software
Astronomy software